Walter Howell Deverell (1827–1854) was a United States-born British artist, closely associated with the Pre-Raphaelite Brotherhood.

Biography
Deverell was born in Charlottesville, Virginia, into an English family who moved back to Britain when Walter was only two years old. He studied art at the Royal Academy Schools, where he met Dante Gabriel Rossetti. He and Rossetti shared a studio in 1851. The Pre-Raphaelites had been founded in 1848, and under Rossetti's influence Deverell's work began to show the influence of the movement, while still retaining features more characteristic of earlier genre painters like Charles Robert Leslie.

It was Deverell who "discovered" Elizabeth Siddal, the Pre-Raphaelites' most important early model. However, despite his attraction to her, she later married Rossetti. Rossetti's assistant Henry Treffry Dunn was recommended for the position by Deverell. After the resignation of James Collinson from the PRB, Rossetti proposed that Deverell should replace him, but no decision was ever made.

Deverell completed very few important works, exhibiting only four paintings at the R.A. before his early death from Bright's disease at the age of twenty-seven. He lived in Kew, now part of London, where one of his paintings, A Pet, was done in his house.

See also
List of Pre-Raphaelite paintings – including the work of Walter Deverell.

References

External links

1827 births
1854 deaths
19th-century British painters
British male painters
Pre-Raphaelite painters
People from Charlottesville, Virginia
People from Kew, London
Deaths from nephritis
Painters from Virginia
19th-century British male artists